The 1878 York by-election was a by-election held in England on 20 February 1878 for the House of Commons constituency of York. The byelection was held due to the incumbent Conservative MP, James Lowther, becoming Chief Secretary for Ireland.  It was retained by the unopposed incumbent.

References

1878 in England
Elections in York
1878 elections in the United Kingdom
By-elections to the Parliament of the United Kingdom in North Yorkshire constituencies
19th century in York
Unopposed ministerial by-elections to the Parliament of the United Kingdom in English constituencies